Colao is a surname. Notable people with the surname include:

 Jordyn Colao, American beauty pageant titleholder
 Vittorio Colao (born 1961), Italian businessman

Italian-language surnames